Peter Fleming and John McEnroe defeated Wojtek Fibak and Tom Okker in the final, 6–4, 6–2, 6–4 to win the doubles tennis title at the 1978 Masters Grand Prix. It was the first of seven consecutive Tour Finals titles for the team, a record.

Bob Hewitt and Frew McMillan were the defending champions, but were defeated in the semifinals by Fleming and McEnroe.

Knockout stage

Draw

References
1978 Masters-Doubles

Doubles